Mattancherry, is a locality in the city of Kochi, India. It is about 9 km south-west from the city center. It is said that the name Mattancherry comes from "Ancherry Mattom", a ''Namboodiri illam'' which the foreign traders then pronounced it as Matt-Ancherry, gradually became Mattancherry. The place where erstwhile 'Ancherry Mattom' located is now a Tamil Brahmin settlement.

Etymology
It is said that the name Mattancherry comes from "Ancherry Mattom", a ''Namboodiri illam'' which the foreign traders then pronounced it as Matt-Ancherry, gradually became Mattancherry. 

Another possible origin is from the Malabari Jewish community which states that the name Mattancherry comes from two words, "Mathana" (מתנה) meaning "gift" in Hebrew and "cheri" (ചേരി) meaning land/Island in malayalam. According to Oral traditions, the land was granted to them as a gift from the Hindu Rajah, hence the name.

Politics
Mattancherry is a part of the Kochi assembly constituency and Ernakulam (Lok Sabha constituency).

Notable Landmarks

Mattancherry is home to the Paradesi Synagogue, India's oldest functioning synagogue, Mattancherry Palace Museum, Mattacherry Pazhayannur Royal temple.
Our Of Life Church Mattancherry and Holy Cross Pilgrim Centre Mattancherry

 Mattancherry Palace ( Dutch Palace) - Mattancherry Palace was the residence of the kings of Kochi.  The palace was built in 1555 by Veera Kerala Varma (1537-1565), the King of Cochin, who built the car and was renovated by the Dutch in 1663 and became known as the 'Dutch Palace'.  Today, there are portraits of the kings of Kochi and many unique murals in India.
Church of our Lady of Health, ( Ingreja de Nossa Senhora do Resgate ) 
Kochi Jain temple 
Gujarati Street 
Jew Town
Kadavumbhagam Mattancherry Synagogue 
Thekkumbhagam Mattancherry Synagogue 

 Paradesi Synagogue - The synagogue was built in 1568 by the Paradesi Jewish people of Kochi. It is also known as the Kochi Jewish Synagogue and the Mattancherry Synagogue. The synagogue is located at what is now known as Jewish Street in Old Kochi. The synagogue was built near the Mattancherry Palace on a site donated by King Rama Varma of Kochi to the Jewish community.  There is only one wall between the palace temple and this synagogue.

Way to reach 

 Nearest airport: Nedumbassery International Airport - 22 km from Kochi.

 Nearest railway station: Ernakulam Junction - 10 km from Mattancherry.

 Nearest bus stand: Ernakulam KSRTC bus stand. City buses also ply from Mattancherry to Aluva, Thripunithura, Kakkanad, Edakochi and back.

Gallery

References

External links
 

 
Neighbourhoods in Kochi